Julius Lichtenfels (19 May 1884 – 29 June 1968) was a German fencer. He competed at the 1908 and 1912 Summer Olympics.

References

1884 births
1968 deaths
German male fencers
Olympic fencers of Germany
Fencers at the 1908 Summer Olympics
Fencers at the 1912 Summer Olympics